Miguel Joaquín Godoy Riofrio (15 March 1907 – 26 March 2002) was a Peruvian basketball player. He competed in the 1936 Summer Olympics. His brother, José Carlos, also competed in the same event.

References

External links
 

1907 births
2002 deaths
Peruvian men's basketball players
Olympic basketball players of Peru
Basketball players at the 1936 Summer Olympics
People from Lima Province
20th-century Peruvian people